Astrid Hoer (born 6 January 1950) is a German wheelchair curler.

She participated in the 2010 Winter Paralympics where German wheelchair curling team finished on eighth place.

Teams

References

External links 
 
 

1950 births
Living people
German female curlers
German wheelchair curlers
German disabled sportspeople
Paralympic wheelchair curlers of Germany
Wheelchair curlers at the 2010 Winter Paralympics